Edmund Poley (1544–1613), of Badley, Suffolk was an English politician. He was a Member of the Parliament of England for Bodmin in 1572–1581, for Knaresborough in 1584 and for Clitheroe in 1586.

Edmund was the son of John Poley and Anne, daughter of Thomas Wentworth. Thomas Poley, MP, was his uncle. He married Catherine Seckford, sister of Charles Seckford, MP.

References

1544 births
1613 deaths
People from Mid Suffolk District
English MPs 1572–1583
English MPs 1584–1585
English MPs 1586–1587